G16 may refer to:

Vehicles 
 , an Auk-class minesweeper of the Mexican Navy
 EMD G16, an American diesel locomotive
 Grumman G-16, an American biplane design later developed into the Grumman F4F monoplane
 , an N-class destroyer of the Royal Dutch Navy
 LSWR G16 class, a British steam locomotive

Other uses 
 Canon PowerShot G16, a digital camera
 County Route G16 (California)
 G16 Dandong–Xilinhot Expressway in China
 Suzuki G16 engine, an automobile engine